The Western Macedonian dialects are one of three groups of Macedonian. The group is located in the western and southwestern areas of North Macedonia and smaller parts in Mala Prespa and Golo Brdo, in Albania, and the Florina regional unit, in Greece. The group of Western Macedonian dialects is divided into two subgroups: the central group and the western and northwestern group.

Dialects

Central group
Prilep-Bitola dialect
Kičevo-Poreče dialect
Skopje-Veles dialect

Western and northwestern group
Upper Polog dialect
Reka dialect
Galičnik dialect
Debar dialect
Drimkol-Golo Brdo dialect
Vevčani-Radožda dialect
Struga dialect
Ohrid dialect
Upper Prespa dialect
Lower Prespa dialect

References

Dialects of the Macedonian language